Barbary Sheep is a 1907, novel by the British writer Robert Hichens. In common with much of the author's work, it has a North African setting.

Film adaptation
In 1917, it was turned into a silent film Barbary Sheep directed by Maurice Tourneur and starring Elsie Ferguson. It was made by Paramount Pictures.

References

Bibliography
 Goble, Alan. The Complete Index to Literary Sources in Film. Walter de Gruyter, 1999.
 Vinson, James. Twentieth-Century Romance and Gothic Writers. Macmillan, 1982.

1907 British novels
Novels by Robert Hichens 
British romance novels
British novels adapted into films